The Iceni Academy (formerly Hockwold and Methwold Community School) is a mixed, all-through school located over two sites in Norfolk, England.

History
The school was first formed as Hockwold and Methwold Community School in September 2011 from the merger of Hockwold Primary School and Methwold High School. Methwold High School was built in 1957 and officially opened on 28 April 1958 by Col. Sir Bartle Edwards. Records suggest that in 1939 children who did not pass the exam to go to Downham Market Grammar School stayed at the Primary School (as it was then) until they were 14 years old.

Hockwold and Methwold Community School was awarded academy status and renamed Iceni Academy in January 2013.

Today the school, which celebrated its 60th birthday in 2018, continues to operate over the original Hockwold and Methwold sites accommodating the primary and secondary departments respectively.

The Academy received its first-ever "Good" rating in July 2016. In 2018 the Academy was recognised for its work to bring the world into the classroom with an award from the British Council.

Location
The Hockwold and Methwold sites are six miles apart and accommodate the primary and secondary departments respectively.

In all, the school serves the largest rural catchment in Norfolk, and each department is smaller than average for that category of school.

Extra-curricular activities
As part of the Cadet Expansion Programme (CEP500) Iceni Academy was approved to set up a Combined Cadet Force which is affiliated with the British Army. They started parading in September 2019 with an initial group of 30 cadets.

Principals
Prior to 2010 - Ken Earl
September 2010 – August 2013 - Denise Walker
September 2013 – December 2017 - Gee Cook
Hockwold (Primary site)
January 2018 – present - Emma Owner
Methwold (Secondary site)
January 2018 – August 2020 - Stephen Plume
September 2020 – present - Lesley Hogg

Senior leadership team
As of March 2023:
Stuart Pryke - Vice Principal
Amy Staniforth - Vice Principal
Sarah Turner - Vice Principal

Notable alumni
Chloe Smith, Member of Parliament for Norwich North

References

External links

Primary schools in Norfolk
Secondary schools in Norfolk
Academies in Norfolk
Educational institutions established in 1957
1957 establishments in England